Canadian Stage is a non-profit contemporary performance arts company based in Toronto, Ontario, Canada.

About Canadian Stage
Canadian Stage is one of Canada's largest not-for-profit contemporary theatre companies, based in Toronto, Ontario. The company was founded in 1987 with the merger of CentreStage and Toronto Free Theatre. Currently, the company has an emphasis on multidisciplinary work, work in translation, programming international contemporary theatre, and developing and producing new Canadian works. Total attendance for a season is approximately 100,000 people. Canadian Stage has produced more than 300 shows - over half of which have been Canadian plays. Canadian Stage also runs a series of artist development and education initiatives, as well as youth and community outreach programs.

Current leadership
The current artistic director of Canadian Stage is Brendan Healy. Healy replaced outgoing artistic director, Matthew Jocelyn, in early 2018. Prior to his appointment at Canadian Stage, Healy maintained leadership positions at the Rose Theatre in Brampton, and Buddies in Bad Times Theatre.

The current executive director of Canadian Stage is Monica Esteves. Esteves joined Canadian Stage after a successful tenure at Crow's Theatre.

Theatres
Canadian Stage presents works at three venues: the 876-seat Bluma Appel Theatre; the Berkeley Street Theatres (244-seat Berkeley Downstairs Theatre and the 167-seat Berkeley Street Upstairs Theatre); and a 1000-seat outdoor amphitheatre in Toronto's High Park where Shakespeare is performed each summer.

The Bluma Appel Theatre in the St. Lawrence Centre for the Arts (a city of Toronto owned building) is the company's main stage. Located at 27 Front Street East, this theatre has been Canadian Stage's home for over 25 years. In the 2016-17 season, they will present eight productions at this theatre. The St. Lawrence Centre for the Arts was constructed in the late 1960s, as part of the city's Centennial Celebrations. It opened in February 1970, but was then called "The Theatre". In 1982, it was renovated by the Thom Partnership. A balcony was added, the lobbies expanded, and the giant chandeliers installed before the theatre re-opened the following year as the Bluma Appel Theatre, in recognition of the generous financial contributions of arts activist Bluma Appel.

The Berkeley Street Theatre complex contains two performance spaces, as well as a large rehearsal space, props and wardrobe facilities, and the company's administrative offices. The Berkeley site was originally built by the Consumer's Gas Corporation in 1887 as part of a gas pumping station complex. The Berkeley Downstairs Theatre was originally a pump room and served in that capacity until 1955, when Consumer's Gas moved their production out of downtown Toronto. A wrecking firm was hired to demolish the buildings in February 1971, but the complex was renovated instead of destroyed thanks to the efforts of Tom Hendry, co-founder of Toronto Free Theatre. The Berkeley Upstairs Theatre was created as part of the general 1976 renovations of the complex. This building is also owned by the City of Toronto.

Situated in the middle of Toronto's High Park, the Amphitheatre can seat over 1,000 people. The first production of Shakespeare in High Park was performed in 1983 between two large oak trees with none of the infrastructure that exists today. The City of Toronto terraced the hillside of the Amphitheatre to provide more comfortable seating in 1997, and a permanent stage was installed in 2005.

Awards
Many of the plays developed by Canadian Stage have been awarded and nominated for Canada's most prestigious literary and performing arts honours, including Governor General's, Chalmers and Dora Mavor Moore Awards. Canadian Stage is a three-time recipient of the Lieutenant Governor's Award for the Arts, in recognition of building private sector and community support. Canadian Stage has been nominated for 296 Dora Mavor Moore Awards, receiving 62, in addition to numerous other Canadian and international awards and nominations.

Partnership with York University
Since 2010, Canadian Stage and York University's Faculty of Fine Arts have collaborated through an MFA in Theatre – Stage Direction. The initiative was launched in 2011 to support the development of directorial talent for the national and international stage. The program develops emerging directors with advanced training in large-scale theatre directing. The first graduates of the program were Ker Wells and Ted Witzel.

Students integrate their studio work at York with involvement in artistic projects at Canadian Stage. The program is customized for each student based on their experience, artistic orientation and goals. Key elements include the opportunity to direct a Canadian Stage production and an internship with a major national or international theatre. Artistic and General Director Matthew Jocelyn and Lead Mentor, Peter Hinton serve to guide students in the MFA program, working closely with graduate faculty in York's Department of Theatre.

Artistic Leadership
Bill Glassco - Producing Director, 1988–1990
Guy Sprung -Producing and Artistic Director 1990-1992
Bob Baker - Artistic Director, 1992–1998
Martin Bragg - Artistic Producer, 1998–2009
Matthew Jocelyn - Artistic & General Director, 2009–2018
Brendan Healy - Artistic Director, 2018–Present

2013–2014 season
The Flood Thereafter - by Sarah Berthiaume
Venus in Fur - by David Ives
Yukonstyle - by Sarah Berthiaume
DESH - choreographed and performed by Akram Khan
Winners and Losers - written and performed by Marcus Youssef and James Long
Needles and Opium - written and directed by Robert Lepage
London Road - by Alecky Blythe and Adam Cork
Tribes - by Nina Raine
Belleville - by Amy Herzog
The Tempest Replica - choreographed and directed by Crystal Pite

2016–2017 season
Concord Floral - by Jordan Tannahill, created and directed by Erin Brubacher, Cara Spooner, and Jordan Tannahill
All But Gone: A Beckett Rhapsody - written by Samuel Beckett, directed by Jennifer Tarver, musical direction by Dáirine Ní Mheadhra
Constellations - by Nick Payne, directed by Peter Hinton.
Dollhouse - choreographed and performed by Bill Coleman/ Music, Audio and Visuals by Gordon Monahan 
Who Killed Spalding Gray? - written and performed by Daniel MacIvor
Jérôme Bosch - choreographed by Marie Chouinard
Liv Stein - by Nino Haratischwili, directed by Matthew Jocelyn
Five Faces for Evelyn Frost - by Guillaume Corbeil
Cirkopolis - by Cirque Éloize
Kiss - by Guillermo Calderon
887 - by Robert Lepage
Spotlight Australia: 
Jack Charles v. the Clown - by Jack Charles (actor)
Blood Links - by Willian Yang
Endings - by Tamara Yang
Meeting - by Antony Hamilton
The Return - created by Yaron Lifschitz with Quincy Grant and the Circa Ensemble.

References

External links
 

Theatre companies in Toronto
Organizations established in 1987